Antoine Marguier was born in 1969 in Switzerland, he is an orchestra conductor and pedagogue.

Biography 
Swiss-French conductor Antoine Marguier starts his career as solo clarinet under the direction of Claudio Abbado in the European Union Youth Orchestra and in the Gustav Mahler Jugendorchester. At the age of 23, Armin Jordan, soon his mentor, appoints him solo bass clarinet at the Orchestre de la Suisse Romande, a position he has held for 16 years.

Under Marek Janowski's leadership, he decides to devote himself to a career of conducting and studies with Roberto Benzi, Armin Jordan, James Levine, Kurt Masur and David Zinman. Soon after his conducting debuts in 2009, Antoine became Jesus Lopez-Cobos's assistant at the Orchestre Français des Jeunes and was appointed Conductor-in-residence at the Orchestre National de Lyon in 2010. In 2017, Antoine is appointed Permanent Conductor of the Seoul International Community Orchestra.

Committed personality Antoine founds in 2011 the United Nations Orchestra based in Geneva, of which he is the Artistic and Music Director. In 2019, the United Nations orchestra becomes the Orchestre des Nations.

As a guest conductor, he has led famous ensembles and orchestras in France and throughout the world such as the philharmonic orchestras of Monte-Carlo, Strasbourg, Nancy, Mulhouse, Marseille, the Orchestre de la Suisse Romande, the Zurich Tonhalle Orchestra, the Ensemble Contrechamps, the Lausanne and Geneva Chamber Orchestras, the Limburgs Symfonie Orkest, Asko Schönberg Ensemble Amsterdam, the Royal Bangkok Symphony Orchestra, the Tenerife Symphony Orchestra, the Lindenbaum Festival Orchestra - Seoul, the Lamoureux Orchestra, The Niiza Symphony Orchestra in Tokyo, The KZN Philharmonic Orchestra in South Africa, the Bohuslav Martinu Philharmonic and the Lausanne Sinfonietta, with whom he was on tour in China in 2007.

He has worked with the following international soloists such as Barbara Hannigan, Khatia Buniatishvili, Maxim Vengerov, Gautier Capuçon, Alexandra Conunova, Miloš Karadaglić, Freddy Kempf, Camille Thomas, Mikhail Rudy, Camille and Julie Berthollet, Mélodie Zhao and Louis Schwizgebel among others.

in 2015, at the initiative of Antoine Marguier, The Georgian pianist Khatia Buniatishvili accepted to participate to a charity concert with the Orchestre des Nations in Geneva in favor of Syrian refugees of Jordan. Nothing is greater than the 2nd Rachmaninov piano concerto to serve a humanitarian cause.

In Geneva, where he resides, he is Professor of chamber music at the Haute École de Musique and Music Director of the Orchestre du Conservatoire, an ensemble composed of the school's most gifted students and their teachers. In 2009, Antoine has been on tour with the HEM Geneva Orchestra in China, including concerts at the prestigious Forbidden City Concert Hall in Beijing and the Grand Opera Houses of Shenyang and Shanghaï. Accomplished pedagogue, Antoine has been invited to give masterclasses in several institutions such as the Yong Siew Toh Conservatory of Music in Singapore, as well as the Seoul National University and the Beijing Central Conservatory in China and the Jerusalem Academy of Music and Dance.

Since 2006, Antoine has been music director of the Compagnie du Rossignol, bringing together comedians and the musicians of the Orchestre de la Suisse Romande. A recording of their complete repertoire, including works commissioned from three contemporary composers, will be available soon.

Antoine Marguier is a member of the Club Diplomatique de Genève

Quotes 

 Antoine Marguier is an outstanding musician and a highly gifted conductor. - Marek Janowski, conductor
 Antoine Marguier is an extremely talented conductor who has enormous future. He shows a remarquable capacity to control the orchestra and possesses an innate sense of interpretation. - David Zinman, conductor
 Antoine Marguier has proven that he is a competent, reliable musician whom I recommend. - Claudio Abbado, conductor
 Précise et efficace, la baguette du chef Antoine Marguier fut particulièrement expressive dans les Nocturnes de Debussy [...] le chef dirigeant avec une dynamique à la fois souple et vivante, créant avec l’orchestre les couleurs du mystère impressionniste. - Orchestre Lamoureux - Flore Estang, musicologie.org - 2016
 Économe en gestes pour déployer les richesses de ces deux partitions, Antoine Marguier, pour la troisième fois à sa tête, enflamme l’Orchestre Philharmonique de l’Opéra de Marseille et la salle d’une baguette incandescente.  - Classiquenews.com - Benito Pelegrin

External links 

 Official website (not active as of 11 oct 2022)
 Impresario database (in French and English)
 Antoine Marguier Linkedin profile
 Orchestre des Nations

Visited countries

References

Aspen Music Festival and School alumni
French male conductors (music)
Living people
Year of birth missing (living people)
Place of birth missing (living people)
21st-century French conductors (music)
21st-century French male musicians